Kampung Bukit Lanchong is a small village in Subang Jaya, Selangor, Malaysia. The village is located between Puchong, UEP Subang Jaya (USJ), Putra Heights, Alam Megah (HICOM), Kota Kemuning and Bandar Saujana Putra. It is currently administered by the Subang Jaya City Council (MBSJ).

References

Subang Jaya
Villages in Selangor